Jamie Delgado and Jonathan Marray were the defending champions, but both players chose not to participate.

Johan Brunström and Frederik Nielsen won the title, defeating Treat Conrad Huey and Dominic Inglot in the final 6–3, 3–6, [10–6].

Seeds

Draw

Draw

References
 Main Draw

Intersport Heilbronn Open - Doubles
2012 Doubles